is a station in Izumo, Shimane Prefecture, Japan.

Lines
West Japan Railway Company (JR West)
Sanin Main Line

Gallery 

Railway stations in Japan opened in 1913
Railway stations in Shimane Prefecture
Sanin Main Line